Fragments of a Cope with the Seven Sacraments refers to a 15th-century cope in the collection of the Historical Museum of Bern. It is part of the church treasure from the  Cathedral of Lausanne sent to Bern after the Protestant conquest of Canton Vaud in 1536. The cope can be attributed to a master from the Netherlands in the circle of Rogier van der Weyden and was probably executed in Tournai where van der Weyden had a workshop from 1432 onwards.

Description 

The piece pictured is the hood. It depicts the Eucharist in the new tradition of the Devotio Moderna that arose in the Netherlands in the fifteenth century. A famous example of this kind of work is the Mantle of the Vestments of the Order of the Golden Fleece dating from around 1425–1450 and now at the  Imperial Treasury, Vienna.

The cope was commissioned by Jacques of Savoy, Count of Romont and presented by him to the Bishop of Lausanne. The Coat of Arms of the Counts of Savoy is embroidered at the bottom and show that the work was made before 1478, the year Jacques of Savoy was admitted to the Order of the Golden Fleece, as it lacks the  Collar of the Golden Fleece.

See also 
 The Justice of Trajan and Herkinbald

References

Bibliography
Campbell, Lorne and Van der Stock, Jan. (ed.) Rogier van der Weyden: 1400–1464. Master of Passions. Leuven: Davidsfonds, 2009. , pp. 370 - 418

External links
 

Embroidery
Rogier van der Weyden
Roman Catholic vestments
Angels in art
Jesus in art
Paintings in Switzerland